The Kentucky Oaks Trophy is a ceremonial trophy which is presented annually to the winner of the Kentucky Oaks horse race.  Since the Kentucky Oaks is run on the Friday preceding the Kentucky Derby, the trophy presentation occurs on Friday evening, the evening before the Derby (which is held on the first Saturday in May).

The trophy presentation is ceremonial only, since the trophy remains in the custody of the Kentucky Derby Museum in Louisville, Kentucky.  The presentation is usually carried in prime-time television.

History of the trophy
The Kentucky Oaks was first run in 1875; its winner gained a purse of $1,175, but the existing records do not mention any trophy as part of the award ceremony.  In 1924 Lemon & Son, Inc. commissioned Redlich & Co. of New York City to create a loving cup, possession of which would signify having won the Kentucky Oaks competition.  Redlich asked George Louis Graff to provide an appropriate design.  The resulting sterling silver design was 25 inches (64 cm) tall, with horse-head handles on each side and an ornate silver horseshoe on top.

Each year the winner's name is engraved on the trophy. In 1955, Churchill Downs had all winners prior to the 1924 race also engraved on the trophy.  The first winner engraved on the trophy was Princess Doreen in 1924. Her owner Harry Stutts, trainer S. Miller Henderson and breeder from the Audley Farm Stable were there for the first ceremonial presentation.

Status of the trophy
The Kentucky Oaks trophy is held at and by the  Kentucky Derby Museum in Louisville.  As a permanent memento, the winning owner of the Oaks receives a set of 12 sterling silver julep cups in a satin-lined wood case. The julep cups are also engraved with the year and the names of the winning team. It is a sentimental tradition that the winning owner gifts a julep cup each to the winning trainer, winning jockey and the breeder of the horse, although there is no requirement to make the gifts.

The winner of the Kentucky Oaks is also presented with a Garland of Lilies draped around the filly's withers. 

The first garland for the Kentucky Oaks was presented to Kathleen, the 1916 winner. It was made of roses, not the lilies that have become synonymous with the filly's race today. Though every Oaks winner since Kathleen has received a garland, the Star Gazer Lily did not become the official flower of the Kentucky Oaks until 1991, when the Kroger Company was commissioned to create a feminine garland for the fillies. Lite Light, winner of the 117th Kentucky Oaks, was the first filly to receive the garland of lilies.

The Star Gazer Lily was selected for its femininity and strength. A total of 133 lilies are sewn onto a white moire fabric backing with a fleur-de-lis pattern, which, like the green satin of the Derby garland, is embroidered in white-on-white with the seal of the Commonwealth of Kentucky at one end and an image of the Twin Spires and the words stating which running of the Kentucky Oaks it is on the opposite end. It is trimmed in a border of Oak Ivy Leaves symbolic of the event. The completed fabric is 116 inches long, 18 inches wide and weighs approximately 18 pounds.  A bouquet of Star Gazer Lillies is also given to the jockey for the winner's circle photo.  Kroger is the official florist of the Kentucky Oaks and Derby. The public can view the lily garland at a local Kroger store the evening before the race.

See also
Kentucky Derby Trophy

References

Horse racing in the United States
Horse racing awards
American horse racing trophies
Churchill Downs
 
Silver objects